Aidalpur is a village in Shahkot. Shahkot is a town in the district Jalandhar of the Indian state of Punjab.

About

Post code
Aidalpur's Post office is Barsalian. It has no PIN code of its own, because it only services itself and/or a neighbouring village

References

Villages in Jalandhar district